Robert Paul Hanner (April 19, 1945 – January 2, 2019) was an American politician and businessman.

Biography

Early years and education
Robert Paul Hanner was born in Americus, Georgia on April 19, 1945 to Jack and Yip Hanner. He attended Parrott Grammar School, Terrell High School, Gordon Military College in Barnesville and Georgia Southwestern State University. He served in the United States Coast Guard in 1967 and 1968 in South Vietnam. Hanner was a farmer. He was involved in the insurance business and estate planning. He lived in Parrott, Georgia for nearly all of his life.

Political career
Hanner was a member of the Georgia House of Representatives from 1974 to 2013. He was a loyal Democrat for most of his political career, advancing to the position of committee Chairman during the decades when Democrats exercised majority rule. Hanner served during a period when House Speaker Tom Murphy waged a fiercely partisan battle against Republicans, drawing district maps during reapportionment which were criticized as pro-Democrat gerrymanders. It was during this period that Congressman Newt Gingrich remarked that "The Speaker, by raising money and gerrymandering, has sincerely dedicated a part of his career to wiping me out." Murphy made Hanner his point man in this effort, as Chairman of the House Legislative & Congressional Reapportionment committee, specifically charged with creating the gerrymandered districts. With the fall of Speaker Murphy, and the shift of power from Democrats to Republicans, Hanner left the Democratic party and switched to the Republicans in 2010.

Death and legacy
Hanner died on January 2, 2019.

See also
 List of American politicians who switched parties in office

References

1945 births
2019 deaths
Members of the Georgia House of Representatives
Georgia (U.S. state) Republicans
Georgia (U.S. state) Democrats
People from Sumter County, Georgia
People from Terrell County, Georgia
Military personnel from Georgia (U.S. state)
Georgia Southwestern State University
Gordon State College alumni
Businesspeople from Georgia (U.S. state)
Farmers from Georgia (U.S. state)
21st-century American politicians
20th-century American businesspeople